The Dixie Dregs is an American jazz rock band from Augusta, Georgia, formed in 1970. They released six studio albums before disbanding in 1983, and have reunited occasionally since 1988. The band's instrumental music fuses elements of rock, jazz, country, and classical music. Their recording "Take It Off the Top" was used for many years as the signature theme tune by disc jockey Tommy Vance for his BBC Radio 1 Friday Night Rock Show.

History

Formation and early years
Dixie Dregs evolved from an Augusta, Georgia, band called Dixie Grit, formed by Steve Morse and Andy West in 1970. The band featured Morse's older brother Dave on drums, Frank Brittingham (guitar and vocals) and Johnny Carr (keyboards). Carr was later replaced by Mark Parrish. Shortly after Steve Morse's enrollment at University of Miami's School of Music in 1971, Dixie Grit was disbanded. Morse and West continued performing as a duo, calling themselves Dixie Dregs (the "Dregs" of "Dixie Grit").

In 1973, Steve Morse (guitar), Andy West (bass), Allen Sloan (violin) and Bart Yarnal (drums) met while students at the University of Miami's School of Music to play as Rock Ensemble II. West also attended Georgia State University for a year while studying cello and music theory and composition along with Parrish. Parrish remained at GSU during the academic school years only to return to Augusta, Georgia, during summer breaks - re-establishing the guitar/bass/keyboards/drums quartet with Morse, West, Parrish, and Gilbert Frayer (drums) performing as opening acts for concerts and headlining local gigs as Dixie Dregs.

During subsequent academic school years, the remaining members of the Dregs, including Andy West, returned to the University of Miami and Mark Parrish returned to Atlanta, Georgia, to complete his degree in music performance and composition at Georgia State University, under the study of William Masselos, with additional studies of electronic music at Columbia University in New York City under Alice Shields, a protégée of Wendy Carlos.

First recording
At the time, the University of Miami hosted a lively musical community, including future professional musicians Pat Metheny, Jaco Pastorius, Danny Gottlieb, T Lavitz and Bruce Hornsby. Rod Morgenstein was asked to fill in as drummer after a surfing accident disabled Yarnal. In 1974, during the school years at UofM, keyboardist Frank Josephs was added to their lineup. In 1975, the group's first effort, The Great Spectacular (named by ex-"Dixie Grit" second guitarist and singer, Frank Brittingham) was recorded at the University. Approximately 1,000 copies of the original LP were pressed.  The album was reissued in 1997 in CD form.

Signed to Capricorn
Based on the strength of a three-song demo and a tip from former Allman Brothers Band members Chuck Leavell and Twiggs Lyndon, Capricorn Records signed them in late 1976 to record their debut album Free Fall (1977). Steve Davidowski was the keyboardist on Free Fall. When Davidowski left to work with fiddler Vassar Clements, former Dixie Grit/Dixie Dregs keyboardist Mark Parrish rejoined the group later that year. The moderate success and critical acclaim of Free Fall led to their 1978 effort, What If, supported by their first tour with dates in New York, Georgia, Florida, South Carolina, North Carolina, Texas, Arizona, Massachusetts, Mississippi, and California.

Their third album, Night of the Living Dregs (featuring Morse, West, Sloan, Parrish, and Morgenstein), was released in April 1979, gaining the band their first Grammy nomination for Best Rock Instrumental Performance, won that year by Paul McCartney's band Wings. Night of the Living Dregs included studio recordings as well as compositions performed live and recorded at the Montreux Jazz Festival on July 23, 1978. Ken Scott, The Beatles' and producer/arranger George Martin's right-hand man and engineer, produced both Dixie Dregs albums, What If and Night of the Living Dregs.

Switch to Arista
In October 1979, Capricorn Records declared bankruptcy, and the band was signed by Arista Records in January 1980, to create three more albums. At that time, keyboardist Parrish left and was replaced by T Lavitz. Later that year, Dregs of the Earth (featuring Morse, West, Sloan, Lavitz, and Morgenstein) was released.

Parrish went on to play piano and keyboards for vocalists Andy Williams, Roberta Flack, Natalie Cole, Luther Vandross, Peabo Bryson, Celine Dion, Regina Belle, Deborah Gibson, Pat Boone and daughter Debby Boone, Glen Campbell and for guitarist Larry Coryell. He won an Angel Award as co-producer of a Christian album, where he arranged and played all the instrumental parts. He has also been musical director, conductor, and keyboard instrumentalist with the touring stage shows of Cats, Meet Me in St. Louis, The Wizard of Oz, Little Shop of Horrors, Nunsense, Brigadoon, The Phantom of the Opera, Anything Goes, and other Broadway stage shows.

Name change

For Unsung Heroes, released in 1981, the band changed their name to The Dregs in an effort to gain more commercial appeal. Violinist Sloan was replaced by Mark O'Connor, winner of Nashville's Grand Masters Fiddle Championship for their 1982 release, Industry Standard. This album introduced vocals for the first time, as a further attempt to gain more airtime. Guest vocalists included the Doobie Brothers's Patrick Simmons and Alex Ligertwood (Santana). Industry Standard provided the Dregs with another Grammy nomination for Best Rock/Jazz Instrumental Performance. The recent name change, vocal additions and a grueling touring schedule did nothing to improve sales, and in 1983, the members of The Dregs decided to disband the group, parting for individual projects.

Reunion
During the early 1980s, the British disc jockey Tommy Vance started using the Dixie Dregs track "Take It Off the Top" as his signature tune for the BBC radio show The Friday Rock Show.

In the late 1980s, the group reunited for a tour featuring former members Morse, Morgenstein (who was also playing with Winger), Lavitz and Sloan. Their return was complemented by a "Best Of" release entitled Divided We Stand (1989). Bassist Dave LaRue completed the lineup for a seven date tour culminating in the 1992 live album Bring 'em Back Alive, which garnered them a third Grammy nomination for Best Rock Instrumental Performance in January 1993 - awarded to Stevie Ray Vaughan and Double Trouble for "Little Wing." Violinist Jerry Goodman, of The Mahavishnu Orchestra fame, filled in for Sloan, who was frequently absent as a result of his busy medical career. They signed a deal with former label Capricorn Records for their first studio album in years entitled Full Circle in 1994.

Today
The Dregs to this day remain a loose collection of its former members, reuniting briefly for short tours and rare studio work. 1997's releases were The Great Spectacular in April and King Biscuit Flower Hour Presents (originally recorded in 1979 for the King Biscuit radio show) in September. California Screamin (2000) is a curious mix of live recordings from the performances at the Roxy Theatre in August 1999. This release features older compositions and covers of the Allman Brothers Band's "Jessica", and Frank Zappa's "Peaches en Regalia" (with Dweezil Zappa sharing guitar lead). 20th Century Masters: The Best of the Dixie Dregs and the DVD Sects, Dregs and Rock 'n' Roll were released in 2002.

On July 3, 2017, Rod Morgenstein announced a reunion tour beginning February 2018 in a YouTube video for Rock, Roots, & Blues - Live.

The first show of the reunion tour dubbed "Dawn of the Dregs" took place on February 28, 2018, in Clearwater, Florida. It featured the original lineup of Steve Morse (guitar), Andy West (bass), Rod Morgenstein (drums), Allen Sloan (violin), and Steve Davidowski (keyboards)

 Musical style 
Dixie Dregs' performances consist entirely of instrumentals, with Industry Standard (1982) being the only album by the band to contain vocals. The band members are noted for their virtuoso playing, and Dixie Dregs' music incorporates elements of many genres, which makes the band's sound difficult to singularly classify. The band's influences include The Allman Brothers Band and Mahavishnu Orchestra. The Boston Herald described the band's music as a fusion of rock, jazz, country, and classical music. The Chicago Tribune categorized Dixie Dregs' music as a fusion of jazz rock and country music. The Christian Science Monitor defined Dixie Dregs' music as being a fusion of bluegrass and classical music. The Times described Dixie Dregs' music as a fusion of progressive rock, heartland rock and jazz.

Personnel
Members

Current members
 Steve Morse – guitar (1970–1983, 1988-present)
 Andy West – bass guitar (1970–1983, 1988, 2017–present)
 Rod Morgenstein – drums (1973–1983, 1988-present)
 Allen Sloan – violin (1973–1981, 1988–1992, 2017-present)
 Steve Davidowski – keyboards (1975–1977, 2017–present)

Former members
 Frank Brittingham – guitar, vocals (1970–1971)
 Dave Morse – drums (1970–1971)
 Johnny Carr – keyboards (1970)
 Mark Parrish – keyboards (1970–1971, 1973, 1977–1978)
 Bart Yarnall – drums (1973)
 Gilbert Frayer – drums (1973)
 Frank Josephs – keyboards (1974–1975)
 T Lavitz – keyboards (1978–1983, 1988–2010; his death)
 Mark O'Connor – violin (1981–1983)
 Dave LaRue – bass guitar (1988–2017)
 Jerry Goodman – violin (1992–2017)

Substitute musicians
 Jordan Rudess – keyboards (1994; filled in for T Lavitz)

 Timeline 

Lineups
{| class="toccolours" border=1 cellpadding=2 cellspacing=0 style="float: width: 375px; margin: 0 0 1em 1em; border-collapse: collapse; border: 1px solid #E2E2E2;" width=99%
|-
! bgcolor="#E7EBEE" valign=top width=25% | 1970As "Dixie Grit"! bgcolor="#E7EBEE" valign=top width=25% | 1970-1971As "Dixie Grit"! bgcolor="#E7EBEE" valign=top width=25% | 1971-1973
! bgcolor="#E7EBEE" valign=top width=25% | 1973
|-
| valign=top |
 Frank Brittingham - guitar, vocals
 Johnny Carr - keyboards
 Dave Morse - drums
 Steve Morse - guitar
 Andy West - bass guitar
| valign=top |
 Frank Brittingham - guitar, vocals
 Dave Morse - drums
 Steve Morse - guitar
 Andy West - bass guitar
 Mark Parrish - keyboards
| valign=top |
 Steve Morse - guitar
 Andy West - bass guitar
| valign=top |
As "Rock Ensemble II"
 Steve Morse - guitar
 Andy West - bass guitar
 Allen Sloan - violin
 Bart Yarnall - drums

As "Dixie Dregs"
 Steve Morse - guitar
 Andy West - bass guitar
 Mark Parrish - keyboards
 Gilbert Frayer - drums
|-
! bgcolor="#E7EBEE" valign=top width=25% | 1973-1974
! bgcolor="#E7EBEE" valign=top width=25% | 1974-1975
! bgcolor="#E7EBEE" valign=top width=25% | 1975-1977
! bgcolor="#E7EBEE" valign=top width=25% | 1977-1978
|-
| valign=top |
 Steve Morse - guitar
 Andy West - bass guitar
 Allen Sloan - violin
 Rod Morgenstein - drums
| valign=top |
 Steve Morse - guitar
 Andy West - bass guitar
 Allen Sloan - violin
 Rod Morgenstein - drums
 Frank Josephs - keyboards
| valign=top |
 Steve Morse - guitar
 Andy West - bass guitar
 Allen Sloan - violin
 Rod Morgenstein - drums
 Steve Davidowski - keyboards
| valign=top |
 Steve Morse - guitar
 Andy West - bass guitar
 Allen Sloan - violin
 Rod Morgenstein - drums
 Mark Parrish - keyboards
|-
! bgcolor="#E7EBEE" valign=top width=25% | 1978-1981
! bgcolor="#E7EBEE" valign=top width=25% | 1981-1983
! bgcolor="#E7EBEE" valign=top width=25% | 1983-1988
! bgcolor="#E7EBEE" valign=top width=25% | 1988-1992
|-
| valign=top |
 Steve Morse - guitar
 Andy West - bass guitar
 Allen Sloan - violin
 Rod Morgenstein - drums
 T Lavitz - keyboards
| valign=top |
 Steve Morse - guitar
 Andy West - bass guitar
 Rod Morgenstein - drums
 T Lavitz - keyboards
 Mark O'Connor - violin
| valign=top |
Group disbanded
| valign=top |
 Steve Morse - guitar
 Rod Morgenstein - drums
 T Lavitz - keyboards
 Dave LaRue - bass guitar
 Allen Sloan - violin
|-
! bgcolor="#E7EBEE" valign=top width=25% | 1992-2010
! bgcolor="#E7EBEE" valign=top width=25% | 2010-2017
! bgcolor="#E7EBEE" valign=top width=25% |2017–present
|-
| valign=top |
 Steve Morse - guitar
 Rod Morgenstein - drums
 T Lavitz - keyboards
 Dave LaRue - bass guitar
 Jerry Goodman - violin
| valign=top |
 Steve Morse - guitar
 Rod Morgenstein - drums
 Dave LaRue - bass guitar
 Jerry Goodman - violin
| valign=top |
 Steve Morse - guitar
 Andy West - bass
 Allen Sloan - violin
 Rod Morgenstein - drums
 Steve Davidowski - keyboards

|}

Discography

Studio albums
 Free Fall  (May 27, 1977) (Note: the LP label lists the title as Freefall)
 What If  (March 1978)
 Night of the Living Dregs  (1979)
 Dregs of the Earth  (1980)
 Unsung Heroes  (1981)
 Industry Standard  (1982)
 Full Circle  (June 7, 1994)

Demo releases
 The Great Spectacular  (1976 - released on CD April 1997)
 Off the Record  (1988) (demo for Ensoniq synthesizers)

Live albums
 Bring 'Em Back Alive  (1992)
 King Biscuit Flower Hour Presents  (September 16, 1997)
 California Screamin'  (February 1, 2000)
 From the Front Row... Live! (Dolby 5.1 DVD-Audio, 2003)

Compilations
 Best of the Dixie Dregs  (1987)
 The Best of the Dregs: Divided We Stand (1989)
 20th Century Masters: The Best of the Dixie Dregs (March 26, 2002)

Video albums
 Sects, Dregs and Rock 'n' Roll (DVD, December 2002)
 Live at Montreux 1978'' (DVD, 2005)

Singles
 1976: "Cruise Control"/"Refried Funky Chicken"/"Cosmopolitan Traveler" (self-released)
 1978: "Take It Off the Top"/"Little Kids"
 1979: "Punk Sandwich"/"Country House Shuffle"
 1980: "Pride O' the Farm"/"The Great Spectacular"
 1981: "Cruise Control"/"Go for Baroque"
 1982: "Crank It Up"/"Bloodsucking Leeches"

References

External links

 
 
 The Dixie Dregs first promo photograph, by Michael Mastro, who also shot the photographs on the back of What If

American southern rock musical groups
Arista Records artists
American progressive rock groups
Musical groups established in 1970
Rock music groups from Georgia (U.S. state)
Articles which contain graphical timelines
Capricorn Records artists
Jazz-rock groups